Feather River Inn is a historic Alpine-style Lodge in Plumas County, California. It lies at an elevation of 4462 feet (1360 m). Feather River Inn is located on California State Route 89 and California State Route 70.

References

External links
timeline

Hotels in California
Buildings and structures in Plumas County, California